Sketches for My Sweetheart the Drunk is a compilation album by the American singer-songwriter Jeff Buckley, released by Columbia Records on May 26, 1998, a year after his death. It comprises recordings Buckley made with the producer Tom Verlaine in 1996 and 1997, along with alternative mixes and demos. It was released after negotiation with Buckley's mother, the owner of his estate. She feared that Sony, owner of Columbia, was trying to exploit his legacy. It received positive reviews.

Recording and release 
Buckley released his debut album, Grace, in 1994. He began recording his second album with the working title My Sweetheart the Drunk in late 1996 with the producer Tom Verlaine. Unsatisfied with the results, Buckley discarded the recordings and went to Memphis with his band to start anew. On the evening of May 29, 1997, Buckley went swimming in the Mississippi River and accidentally drowned. 

As Buckley left no will, his estate transferred to his mother, Mary Guibert. Soon after Buckley's memorial ceremonies, Guibert learned that Sony was in the process of mixing and mastering the Verlaine recordings for release. This angered Guibert and Buckley's band, as Buckley had not wanted to release them. Through her lawyer, Guibert sent a cease-and-desist letter to Sony.

Sony had not made back its investment on its record deal with Buckley and was eager to release a new album. Guibert would allow them to release only material that was "worth using". They compromised on a double album, with the Verlaine recordings on one disc and Buckley's later demos on the other. Guibert did not allow Sony to alter the demos, saying: "If this was his body here and we were preparing it for his funeral, we would not put him in a suit. We would put him in a flower shirt and some black jeans and his Doc Martens and leave his hair all mussed up."

Reception
My Sweetheart the Drunk received positive reviews. Biographers and critics wrote that Buckley had been "reaching fruitfully in multiple directions". The biographers Dave Lory and Jim Irvin identified influences from Siouxsie and the Banshees on "Nightmares by the Sea" and "Witches Rave". The Los Angeles Times cited John Lennon and Nusrat Fateh Ali Khan as references. The reviewer Steve Hochman likened the track "Everybody Here Wants You" to a "70s-ish soul experiment worthy of Marvin Gaye or Al Green", and linked "New Year's Prayer" to Led Zeppelin's "Kashmir".

Track listing
All tracks composed by Jeff Buckley, except where noted.

Personnel
Jeff Buckley – guitar, vocals
Michael Tighe – guitar
Mick Grøndahl – bass guitar
Eric Eidel – drums
Parker Kindred – drums

Technical
Tom Verlaine – producer
Nicholas Hill – producer on "Satisfied Mind"
Jeff Buckley, Michael J. Clouse, Ray Martin, Irene Trudel – engineer
Jim Caruana, Joe Lizzi, David Seitz – assistant engineer
Tom Cadley, Michael J. Clouse, Mary Guibert, Tom Verlaine, Andy Wallace – mixing
Steve Sisco – mixing assistant 
Nicky Lindeman, Gail Marowitz – art direction, design
Merri Cyr – photography
Bill Flanagan, Mary Guibert – liner notes

Charts

Weekly charts

Year-end charts

Certifications

References

Jeff Buckley albums
1998 compilation albums
Compilation albums published posthumously
Columbia Records compilation albums
Demo albums